Kökar is an island municipality to the south-east of the Åland archipelago, Finland.

It is also one of the municipalities of Åland. It is reachable by boat from Långnäs on Åland or from Galtby with access to mainland Finland.

The municipality is unilingually Swedish.    
The natural reserve of Östra Långskär is located there. Other notable islands include Kyrkogårdsö.

Ulla-Lena Lundberg, a Finnish author, was born in Kökar in 1947.

History
Kökar was first inhabited over 3,000 years ago by seal hunters. A Franciscan monastery was founded in Hamnö in the 15th century. Today the monastery is in ruins. The church dedicated to St. Anne was built in 1784 in the place of the old monastery church.

Sights
The church of St. Anne was built in the site of the old monastery church during the reign of king Gustav III and is located on the island of Hamnö. It is next to the ruins of the monastery. The belltower was built in the 19th century. The belltower had to be restored after an Autumn storm damaged it in 1978. A model of a sailing ship hangs in the church. It was given by a local sailor who had been captured by North African pirates but who later managed to escape. The model has 64 cannons.

The local museum was opened in 1988 and its purpose is to show how the people of Kökar lived in the 19th century and onwards to the 1940s. The now museum building, built in 1913, used to be an old school.

There is also a Bronze Age site dating back to 1150–1050 BC. It was found in 1918.

References

External links

Municipality of Kökar – Official website 
The museum of Kökar's web site

Municipalities of Åland
Finnish islands in the Baltic
Landforms of Åland